It Sticks Out Half a Mile is a BBC Radio sitcom created by Harold Snoad and Michael Knowles as a sequel to the television World War II sitcom Dad's Army, for which Snoad and Knowles had written radio adaptations.

Main cast

 John Le Mesurier - Arthur Wilson 
 Ian Lavender - Frank Pike 
 Bill Pertwee - Bert Hodges 
 Vivienne Martin - Miss Perkins 
 Michael Knowles - Ernest Woolcott 
 Arthur Lowe - George Mainwaring (Pilot Episode Only)

The pilot

The original pilot episode, set in 1948, involved former bank manager and Home Guard Captain Mainwaring (Arthur Lowe) deciding to renovate a decrepit seaside pier in the fictional town of Frambourne-on-Sea, only to find when applying for a bank loan that the manager of the local branch is his former chief cashier and Home Guard Sergeant Arthur Wilson (John Le Mesurier).

The pier was allegedly built by Eugenius Birch.

The pilot, recorded in July 1981, was not used and Lowe died in April 1982, ending production; however, Lowe's widow had enjoyed the show and persuaded the writers to start again with a new cast. The original pilot was eventually broadcast on BBC 7, and later BBC 7's successor, BBC Radio 4 Extra.

The series would never have been made had Arthur Lowe lived. The BBC rejected the 1981 pilot, on the grounds that his illness had affected his voice. Although the slur in his speech was actually due to illness, the BBC worried that it made him sound as if he was drunk, and ruled his performance as unacceptable for transmission.

The series

Still set in 1948, the modified version involves Bert Hodges (Bill Pertwee), former ARP warden and nemesis of Mainwaring's Home Guard unit, approaching former Home Guard Private Frank Pike (Ian Lavender), now 22 years old, with a proposal to renovate the near derelict pier, costing £5,000, at Frambourne. In order to finance this plan Pike has to approach bank manager Arthur Wilson (Le Mesurier), who just happens to be his "uncle" (publicly a friend of his mother's, but strongly hinted to the audience to be Pike's father), for a loan. Wilson is blackmailed by Pike (who is no longer the young innocent of Dad's Army) over past indiscretions with a woman named Smith and Wilson suspects the only reason Hodges approached Pike was to get to the bank's money through him. Nevertheless, Pike and Wilson put aside their wartime quarrel with Hodges – more or less – and the renovation begins. As well as Pike, Wilson and Hodges, other characters that appear commonly are Miss Perkins, a bank clerk who giggles a lot, and is implied to be in love with Wilson, and Guthrie, the attendant in charge with supervising the pier who has a perforated eardrum.

Broadcast
Due to the death of Arthur Lowe, the original pilot was not broadcast and the tape wiped, but co-writer Snoad retained a copy which he later returned to the BBC. A short excerpt was played on a documentary entitled Radio's Lost Property on 1 November 2003, with the complete programme heard on a BBC 7 compilation entitled Some of Our Archives were Missing on 29 May 2004. It was broadcast for a second time on 17 June 2008, as the first episode in a rerun of the entire series.

The series proper was first broadcast on BBC Radio 2, at 1.30pm on 13 November 1983 and ran for 13 episodes. It was subsequently repeated again on BBC Radio 2, but an apparent mix-up between different BBC departments resulted in most of the broadcast tapes being wiped. The series featured some of John Le Mesurier's last performances.

The BBC's Treasure Hunt unearthed off-air recordings of It Sticks Out Half a Mile, and the digital radio archive channel BBC 7 has broadcast the recovered copies of the series.

BBC Radio 4 Extra has begun repeating the whole series, including the pilot, in June 2020. Since 30 June 2020, all fourteen episodes have been made available for listening on Spotify.

TV adaptations

There were two attempts to adapt the show for television – without the Dad's Army characters. The first was a BBC pilot, Walking the Planks, starring Michael Elphick, but the BBC did not commission a series. Knowles and Snoad took the concept to Yorkshire Television who produced a seven-part series under a new title, High & Dry. In the role previously performed by Elphick, Bernard Cribbins was cast. Richard Wilson and Vivienne Martin appeared in both versions.

Episodes

Pilot

Series 1

References

External links 
RadioListings broadcast guide
It Sticks Out Half A Mile episode guide
BBC Treasure Hunt page - with sound clip

Dad's Army
BBC Radio comedy programmes
Lost BBC episodes